Borbon, officially the Municipality of Borbon,  is a 4th class municipality in the province of Cebu, Philippines. According to the 2020 census, it has a population of 38,187 people.

History 

According to the Panublion publication, Borbon was established as a parish on 15 September 1862 and had San Sebastian as its patron saint.  Today St. Sebastian's fiesta is celebrated every 20 January. Borbon was formerly a visita or an extension community of the town of Sogod. That is why many of the first settlers of Borbon were families whose roots can be traced back to relatives in Sogod.

In addition,  describes the Borbon church made of wood and tabique resting on a base of mortar, dimensions .  The church was thatched with grass.  The original church is believed to have been one of the oldest churches in Cebu prior to its demolition after World War II.

The town was said to have been named after the Bourbon royal family, or a misinterpretation of the Cebuano term "Bonbon" which means pebbly sand, but the generally accepted history of its name is of legend.

Geography 
Borbon is bordered on the north by the town of Tabogon, to the west by the town of Tabuelan, on the east by the Camotes Sea, and on the south by the town of Sogod.

Silmugi River

Silmugi River is an eco-tourism site in northern Cebu. It is where the rainwater from the many mountain barangays cascades and discharges into the sea.

The river played a big part during Borbon's formation as a town because in the past the river was known to be so big and wide that many boats traveled it.

Barangays

Borbon comprises 19 barangays:

Climate

Demographics

Economy

Source of livelihood:
Farming- this source of livelihood generally dominates in Borbon. It includes crop,livestock,forest,rented out land, agriculture, farm machinery, vegetable and fodder.
Fishing

Culture

Silmugi Festival

Silmugi Festival is a celebration to honor the patron saint, St. Sebastian the Martyr . The highlight of this event is the street dancing which involves a traditional prayer for a bountiful harvest and various barangays take part.
"Silmugi" is an old name of the town of Borbon during the Pre-Spanish period which was named after the enchanting and enthralling river which was served as the nearest route for devout Catholics attending mass in Saint Sebastian Parish. The river has also become the main gateway for locals who lived in the hillsides of Borbon to conduct their business trade with coastal barangays surrounding it.
The festival was eventually replaced by the Tuba Festival, which highlights more on the Toddy industry of the town. This change of name and focus was a move aimed at boosting the local economy of Coconut Toddy, known locally as "Tuba", in the town by endorsing it as a local cuisine and tourist attraction. Despite these changes, much of the celebration hasn't been greatly altered since the original festival of the town.

Education

Schools:
Bongoyan Elementary School
Don Emilio Osmena Memorial School
Cajel Elementary School
Campusong Elementary School
Bongdo Elementary School
Laaw Elementary School
Cadaruhan Elementary School
Don Gregorio Antigua Elementary School
Doña Mary R. Osmeña Memorial Elementary School
Dona Milagros Osmena Elementary School
Tabunan National High School
Cebu Technical University-Tabogon Campus

References

Sources

External links
 [ Philippine Standard Geographic Code]

Municipalities of Cebu
1862 establishments in the Philippines